Isaac Ben Hagins (born March 2, 1954) is a former American football wide receiver in the National Football League (NFL). He was drafted by the Minnesota Vikings in the ninth round of the 1976 NFL Draft. He played college football at Southern.

Hagins also played for the Tampa Bay Buccaneers.

External links
Tampa Bay Buccaneers bio

1954 births
Living people
American football wide receivers
Southern Jaguars football players
Tampa Bay Buccaneers players
Players of American football from Shreveport, Louisiana